A short term benefit advance is a feature of the British social security system whereby a claimant can get an advance of certain benefit payments in the form of a loan which they have to pay back. Short term benefit advances are designed to support those who are in financial need.

See also
Hardship payments in the United Kingdom

References

Welfare in the United Kingdom